Massachusetts House of Representatives' 2nd Norfolk district in the United States is one of 160 legislative districts included in the lower house of the Massachusetts General Court. It covers part of the city of Quincy in Norfolk County. Democrat Tackey Chan of Quincy has represented the district since 2011.

The current district geographic boundary overlaps with that of the Massachusetts Senate's Norfolk and Plymouth district.

Representatives
 Abijah W. Draper, circa 1858 
 William McCarty, circa 1859 
 George Nathaniel Carpenter, circa 1888 
 Erland F. Fish, circa 1920 
 Renton Whidden, circa 1920 
 William Whittem Jenness, circa 1951 
 Thomas F. Brownell, circa 1975 
 Arthur S. Tobin
 Tackey Chan, 2011-current

Former locales
The district previously covered:
 Brookline, circa 1927 
 West Roxbury, circa 1872

See also
 List of Massachusetts House of Representatives elections
 Other Norfolk County districts of the Massachusetts House of Representatives: 1st, 3rd, 4th, 5th, 6th, 7th, 8th, 9th, 10th, 11th, 12th, 13th, 14th, 15th
 List of Massachusetts General Courts
 List of former districts of the Massachusetts House of Representatives

Images
Portraits of legislators

References

External links
 Ballotpedia
  (State House district information based on U.S. Census Bureau's American Community Survey).

House
Government of Norfolk County, Massachusetts